Three-time defending champion Rafael Nadal defeated David Ferrer in the final, 6–3, 6–2, 6–3 to win the men's singles tennis title at the 2013 French Open. It was his record-extending eighth French Open title and his twelfth major title overall. With the win, Nadal recorded his 59th French Open match win, surpassing the previous record held by Guillermo Vilas and Roger Federer (who equaled Vilas' record with his fourth round win but lost in the quarterfinals). Nadal also became the first man in history to win any major eight times and tied Roy Emerson for the third-most major titles of all time. He also tied with Max Decugis, who won eight titles at this event when it was only open to French club members.

In the semifinal encounter between Nadal and Novak Djokovic, they played a notably long match which lasted 4 hours and 37 minutes. It was dubbed by some commentators as the best clay court match ever, and one of the greatest matches ever played. Nadal outlasted Djokovic to win 6–4, 3–6, 6–1, 6–7(3–7), 9–7.

Federer attempted to become the first man in the Open Era to achieve a double career Grand Slam, but he lost to Jo-Wilfried Tsonga in the quarterfinals. With his loss, a new French Open finalist was guaranteed from the bottom half of the draw; Ferrer emerged to become that player. This created the first all-Spanish Grand Slam final since 2002 and the first occasion since 2004 that two compatriots contested a major final.

Despite the victory, Nadal dropped one place down the rankings to world No. 5 following Ferrer's run to the final.

Seeds

Qualifying

Draw

Finals

Top half

Section 1

Section 2

Section 3

Section 4

Bottom half

Section 5

Section 6

Section 7

Section 8

Road to the final
For the first time in his career, Rafael Nadal lost a set in both of the first two rounds.  In the semi-finals, he faced off against world number one Novak Djokovic.  In an epic five setter, Nadal triumphed 6–4, 3–6, 6–1, 6–7 (3–7), 9–7.

David Ferrer advanced to the final of a Grand Slam for the first time in his career. He did not lose a single set in the tournament before the final.

Final
Third-seeded Nadal from Spain faced off against fourth-seeded David Ferrer in the finals of the French Open.  Both players employed the same strategy, trying to win points from the baseline.  Nadal won a break early in the first set, but lost it back quickly and had to fend off two other break points during the set.  Nadal ending up winning the first set 6–3. Down 3–1 in the second set, Ferrer had four break points to get back into the set. However, Nadal fought them all off, winning the last point on a 31-shot rally, the longest of the match.  From there he cruised to a 6–2 set victory.  Aided by a Ferrer double fault on break point, Nadal took the third set 6–3 for a three set to none victory.

Nadal had been dominant on clay during his career, but took seven months off from mid-2012 to February 2013 to recover from a knee injury.  He showed few signs of the injury during the final as he tracked down balls from corner to corner and hit numerous topspin-laden winners.  "This one is very special one," said Nadal after the match. "When you have period of time like I had, you realize that you don't know if you will have the chance to be back here with this trophy another time."

The two-hour sixteen-minute match was briefly interrupted by noisy protesters, one of whom ran onto the court with a lit flare. Tournament director Gilbert Ysern said security "acted efficiently and quickly and handled [the situation] very well."  Both players appeared to be rattled by the event, dropping serve immediately after it.  "I felt a little bit scared at the first moment because I didn't see what's going on. I just turned there and I watch a guy with some fire," remarked Nadal.  Ferrer said the event did not affect his play.  Ten people were arrested in total.

With his win, Nadal became the first man to win the same Grand Slam event eight times.  It was his 12th major overall, putting him tied for third on the all-time list behind Roger Federer (17) and Pete Sampras (14).  With his victory Nadal's record was 59–1 all time in Paris.  Nadal broke the men's record for most victories at the French Open and improved to 20–4 against Ferrer.

References

External links
Official Roland Garros 2013 Men's Singles Draw
 Main Draw
2013 French Open – Men's draws and results at the International Tennis Federation

Men's Singles
French Open by year – Men's singles
French Open – Men's Singles